This is a list of destinations that Play has operated to . Originally established in July 2019, the Icelandic low-cost airline launched flights from its hub at Keflavík International Airport in June 2021, initially with flights within Europe. Starting in April 2022, the airline began operating flights to North America.

List

References

Lists of airline destinations